The 1980 Long Beach State 49ers football team represented California State University, Long Beach during the 1980 NCAA Division I-A football season.

Cal State Long Beach competed in the Pacific Coast Athletic Association. The team was led by fourth-year head coach Dave Currey, and played home games at Anaheim Stadium in Anaheim, California. They finished the season as champions of the PCAA, with a record of eight wins, three losses (8–3, 5–0 PCAA).

Schedule

Roster

Team players in the NFL
The following were selected in the 1981 NFL Draft.

Notes

References

Long Beach State
Long Beach State 49ers football seasons
Big West Conference football champion seasons
Long Beach State 49ers football